The Lafari Party is a political party in the Solomon Islands, which was founded in 2005. 
At the legislative elections on 5 April 2006, the party won 2.8% of the vote and 2 out of 50 seats.

References

Political parties in the Solomon Islands